Shaikh Khalifa Bin Zayed Bangladesh Islamia School & College is an educational institute providing academic education to Bangladeshi and international students in Abu Dhabi, UAE, for secondary and higher secondary education. Special emphasis is given to English, Arabic, Bengali, and Islamic Studies for Muslim students in Abu Dhabi.

History
The school was founded on 23 August 1980, and began operations with class I to class V. In 1990, it moved to a new building in Abu Dhabi on land donated by Sheikh Zayed bin Sultan Al Nahyan. A college section was added in 1991.

The school was one of four to win a Zayed Future Energy Prize in the Global High School category in 2013. They won for their plans to reduce the school's energy consumption by 40 percent, a proposal driven by the school's eco club. Energy-efficient lighting installed in 2012 reduced energy use by 15 percent. The school used the $100,000 award to install solar panels on its auditorium roof that produce a further 15 percent of their energy needs, and to partner with the University of Leeds on the design and construction of wind towers to passively cool school buildings.

References

External links

 School website

Educational institutions established in 1980
International schools in Abu Dhabi
Schools in the Emirate of Abu Dhabi
Bangladesh–United Arab Emirates relations
Bangladeshi international schools
1980 establishments in the United Arab Emirates